is a 1963 Japanese police procedural crime film directed by Akira Kurosawa, starring Toshiro Mifune, Tatsuya Nakadai and Kyōko Kagawa. The film is loosely based on the 1959 novel King's Ransom by Ed McBain (Evan Hunter).

Plot
A wealthy executive named Kingo Gondo (Toshiro Mifune) is in a struggle to gain control of a company called National Shoes. One faction wants the company to make cheap, low quality shoes for the impulse market as opposed to the sturdy and high quality shoes currently being produced. Gondo believes that the long-term future of the company will be best served by well made shoes with modern styling, though this plan is unpopular because it means lower profits in the short term. He has secretly set up a leveraged buyout to gain control of the company, mortgaging all he has.

Just as he is about to put his plan into action, he receives a phone call from someone claiming to have kidnapped his son, Jun. Gondo is prepared to pay the ransom, but the call is dismissed as a prank when Jun comes in from playing outside. However, Jun's playmate, Shinichi, the child of Gondo's chauffeur, is missing and the kidnappers have mistakenly abducted him instead.

In another phone call the kidnapper reveals that he has discovered his mistake but still demands the same ransom. Gondo is now forced to make a decision about whether to pay the ransom to save the child or complete the buyout. After a long night of contemplation Gondo announces that he will not pay the ransom, explaining that doing so would not only mean the loss of his position in the company, but cause him to go into debt and throw the futures of his wife and son into jeopardy. His plans are weakened when his top aide lets the "cheap shoes" faction know about the kidnapping in return for a promotion should they take over. Finally, under pressure from his wife and the chauffeur, Gondo decides to pay the ransom. Following the kidnapper's instructions, the money is put into two small briefcases and thrown from a moving train; Shinichi is found unharmed.

Gondo is forced out of the company and his creditors demand the collateral in lieu of debt. The story is widely reported however, making Gondo a hero, while the National Shoe Company is vilified and boycotted. Meanwhile, the police eventually find the hideout where Shinichi was kept prisoner. The bodies of the kidnapper's two accomplices are found there, killed by an overdose of heroin. The police surmise that the kidnapper engineered their deaths by supplying them with uncut drugs. Further clues lead to the identity of the kidnapper, a medical intern at a nearby hospital, but there is no hard evidence linking him to the accomplices' murders.

The police lay a trap by first planting a false story in the newspapers implying that the accomplices are still alive, and then forging a note from them demanding more drugs. The kidnapper is then apprehended in the act of trying to supply another lethal dose of uncut heroin to his accomplices, after testing the strength on a drug addict who overdoses and dies. Most of the ransom money is recovered, but too late to save Gondo's property from auction. With the kidnapper facing a death sentence, he requests to see Gondo while in prison and Gondo finally meets him face to face. Gondo has gone to work for a rival shoe company, earning less money but enjoying a free hand in running it. The kidnapper at first feigns no regrets for his actions. As he reveals that envy from seeing Gondo's house on the hill every day led him to conceive of the crime, his emotions gradually gain control over him and he ends up breaking down emotionally before Gondo after finally facing his failure.

Cast
Toshiro Mifune as 
Kyōko Kagawa as 
Isao Kimura as 
Takeshi Katō as 
Takashi Shimura as the Chief of the Investigation Section
Susumu Fujita as Manager of Investigations
Yoshio Tsuchiya as  
Jun Tazaki as  
Nobuo Nakamura as  
Yunosuke Ito as 
Kōji Mitsui as reporter
Minoru Chiaki as reporter
Eijirō Tōno as factory worker
Kamatari Fujiwara as incineration worker
Masao Shimizu as prison director
Kyū Sazanka as creditor
Akira Nagoya as Yamamoto
Kō Nishimura as creditor
Jun Hamamura as creditor
Ikio Sawamura as trolley man
Kin Sugai as addict
Masao Oda as executor
Gen Shimizu as chief physician

Production
High and Low was filmed at Toho Studios and on location in Yokohama. The film includes stock music from The H-Man (1958).

Kurosawa included cameos by many of his popular stock performers, making its star-studded cast one of the film's best-remembered highlights.

The film foregrounds the modern infrastructure of the economic miracle years and the run-up to the 1964 Tokyo Olympics, including rapid rail lines and the proliferation of personal automobiles.

Release

High and Low was released in Japan on 1 March 1963. The film was released by Toho International with English subtitles in the United States on 26 November 1963.

Reception
The Washington Post wrote that "High and Low is, in a way, the companion piece to Throne of Blood – it's Macbeth, if Macbeth had married better. The movie shares the rigors of Shakespeare's construction, the symbolic and historical sweep, the pacing that makes the story expand organically in the mind".

Stanley Kauffmann of The New Republic after asking why Kurosawa wanted to make High and Low, wrote "To say all this is not, I hope, to discourage the reader from seeing this film. Very much the reverse. Two hours and twenty three minutes of fine entertainment are not a commonplace achievement. Also, from the opening frame (literally) to the last, Kurosawa never makes the smallest misstep nor permits it in anyone else".

Martin Scorsese included it on a list of "39 Essential Foreign Films for a Young Filmmaker."

On the review aggregator website Rotten Tomatoes, High and Low has an approval rating of 95% based on 21 reviews, with an average score of 8/10. In 2009 the film was voted at No. 13 on the list of The Greatest Japanese Films of All Time by Japanese film magazine Kinema Junpo.

References

Bibliography

External links
 High and Low  at the Japanese Movie Database
 
 
 
 
 
High and Low an essay by Chuck Stephens at the Criterion Collection 
High and Low: Between Heaven and Hell an essay by Geoffrey O'Brien at the Criterion Collection

1963 films
1963 crime drama films
Japanese crime drama films
1960s Japanese-language films
Police detective films
1960s police procedural films
Japanese black-and-white films
Films directed by Akira Kurosawa
Toho films
Films set in Yokohama
Films with screenplays by Akira Kurosawa
Films with screenplays by Hideo Oguni
Films with screenplays by Ryuzo Kikushima
Films produced by Ryuzo Kikushima
Films produced by Tomoyuki Tanaka
Films scored by Masaru Sato
Films based on novels by Ed McBain
Films about kidnapping
1960s Japanese films